Local elections were held in Bomet County on 4 March 2013 to elect a Governor and County Representatives. Under the new constitution, which was passed in a 2010 referendum, the 2013 general elections were the first in which Governors and members of the County Assemblies for the newly created counties were elected.  They will also be the first general elections run by the Independent Electoral and Boundaries Commission(IEBC) which has released the official list of candidates.

Gubernatorial election

Prospective candidates
The following are some of the candidates who have made public their intentions to run: 
 Isaac Ruto - Chepalungu MP
 Julius Kones - Konoin MP 
 Clement Kiplangat Mutai - businessman 
 Shadrack Rotich -  Manager with the Association of Local Government Authorities of Kenya (Algak), 
 John Koech - former East African Community Minister 
 Sammy Kirui - former Local Government Permanent Secretary

References

 

2013 local elections in Kenya